Archbishop Dominic Jala, S.D.B. (12 July 1951 – 10 October 2019) was the Metropolitan Archbishop of the Roman Catholic Archdiocese of Shillong and the Apostolic Administrator of the Roman Catholic Diocese of Nongstoin, India.

Early life 
Jala was born on 12 July 1951 in Mawlai, Meghalaya, India.

Priesthood 
Jala was ordained a Catholic Priest for the Salesians of Saint John Bosco congregation on 19 November 1977.

Episcopate 
Jala was appointed Metropolitan Archbishop of the Roman Catholic Archdiocese of Shillong, India on 22 December 1999 and ordained a Bishop on 2 April 2000. He was appointed Apostolic Administrator of the Roman Catholic Diocese of Nongstoin, India on 15 October 2016.

Death 
Archbishop Jala died in an automobile accident, on 10 October 2019, in Colusa County, California, U.S.

Writings 
 Liturgy and mission

References

External links

1951 births
2019 deaths
20th-century Roman Catholic archbishops in India
People from East Khasi Hills district
Salesian bishops
21st-century Roman Catholic archbishops in India
Road incident deaths in California